Elisha Haydon Collier (1788–1856) of Boston, USA, invented a flintlock revolver around 1814. His weapon is one of the earliest true revolvers, in contrast to the earlier pepperboxes which were multi-barreled guns. Collier's revolver was not self rotating but it was self-priming: a compartment automatically released gunpowder into the pan when the hammer was cocked.

Gunmaking 

It was patented in 1818, produced from 1819 by John Evans & Son of London, and purchased by European officers in the presidency armies. Over 10,000 of value (approximately 160 long guns) in pound sterling was supposedly to be made and contracted for India according to Elisha H. Collier's testimony in the 1851 Colt vs. Massachusetts Arms Company patent infringement trial of 1851 (J. Harrison - The Gun Collector Number 35 Feb 1951, pp. 553–555.) but further on in testimony was diminished by Mr. Collier suggesting that this number was only anticipated. It is known that there are but approximately 225 Collier pistols and long guns were made between 1819 and 1824 according to known serial numbers between the three types. A single barrel allowed greater accuracy and a faster reload time while reducing unnecessary weight. However, its flintlock action was a serious drawback: flints were unreliable and had to be changed frequently, while inferior quality powder risked a misfire.

Samuel Colt saw weapons of this type while serving as a cabin boy aboard the brig Corvo in 1832. Following his return from the Far East he was inspired to create his own caplock revolver: the Colt Paterson.

In addition to handguns, Collier produced revolving shotguns and carbines in the 1820s. Only 150 of these now rare guns were made.

Other activities 
In the 1830s Collier invented a new boiler for steam ships. He wrote a book on the subject, which was published in 1836. In 1839 Collier designed a machine for mass-producing nails for the Globe Dock Factory, Rotherhithe, Surrey.

Later life 
Collier lived in England from 1818 until 1850, when he returned to Boston, Massachusetts. By this time Colt's cheaper mass-produced revolvers had supplanted his earlier, hand made designs. Collier is listed as having lived at 88 Eliot Street in an 1850 census, where he died on January 23, 1856.

References

19th-century American inventors
American engineers
Gunsmiths
1788 births
1856 deaths
People of the Victorian era